Trinity Football may refer to:

 Dublin University American Football Club, the American football team of Trinity College, Dublin, Ireland
 Trinity College football, the American football team of Trinity College, Connecticut